Debbie Heald is a former American middle distance runner.

Heald is the daughter of Richard and Ernestine Heald. She grew up in La Mirada, California.

At the age of eleven, Heald was a member of the Hutchinson Track Club.  At a meet in Lancaster she finished a mile race with a time of 5:33.9, which at the time was the fastest time recorded for a girl of her age.

By the time she was fourteen, Heald had won three state championships in running competitions and five district Amateur Athletic Union titles. She also held two national crowns.

As a 16-year-old junior at Neff High School in La Mirada, California, Heald defeated 1500m world record holder Tamara Pangelova of the USSR on March 17, 1972 at the Richmond Coliseum. In doing so, Heald set a new women's world indoor mile record at 4 minutes 38.5 seconds.[

Heald's American high school girl's indoor mile record stood for over 40 years, until finally broken on January 26, 2013 by Mary Cain of Bronxville, NY. Until that time, Heald's was the longest standing of any girls' high school record.

Heald attended California State University, graduating with a degree in education.

Heald continued to train throughout her college years, but her career was progressively hampered by repeated injuries and tendonitis from overtraining, as well as a diagnosis of schizophrenia.

In 2002, Heald carried the Olympic torch in Los Angeles on its nationwide tour in advance of the Winter Olympic Games at Salt Lake City.

References

Year of birth missing (living people)
Living people
American female middle-distance runners
California State University alumni
21st-century American women